There are 3 private national radio stations, 1 public, and 63 local radio stations in Albania. Public radio signal of RTSH Radio Tirana 1 covers 80.5% of the territory, while those of Top Albania Radio and Club FM, both commercial radio stations with a national license, cover 93.7%, and the western lowland respectively. In 2020, the third private national frequency license was awarded to Radio Klan, part of Televizioni Klan sh.a. There are some ongoing initiatives to measure audience shares in the country, but they are limited in geographical scope and the results are not public. However, radio stations seem to be more of an entertainment medium, with mainly music, interrupted by news flashes or talk show programs.

National stations
Radio Tirana 1
Club FM
Top Albania Radio
Radio Klan

Local frequency stations
Below is a list of radio stations operating in Tirana, Albania with some partly covering the western lowland (as of 2021):

See also
Music of Albania
Mass media in Albania

References

External links
Radiomap.eu, Radio stations LIVE from Tirana, Albania
Tunein.com - Radio Stations from Albania Live Streaming
Radio Ownership in Albania - Media Ownership Monitor: Albania
RTA - The First Radio Portal from Albania
AMA - Audiovisual Media Authority of Albania

Bibliography
Muka, Arben. 70 radio shqip ne 70 vite (1938-2008), Tirana, ABC Media Center: 2008.

Albania
Radio stations in Albania
Radio stations